John Harmer may refer to:

 John Harmer (mayor), mayor of Williamsburg, Virginia, 1737–1738
 John L. Harmer (born 1934), former California politician
 John Harmer (bishop) (1884–1944), Anglican bishop

See also 
 John Harmar (c. 1555–1613), English classical scholar
 John Harmar (philologist) (1594?–1670), English cleric and academic